Novotný (feminine Novotná) is a Czech and Slovak surname. Notable persons with that surname include:
 Antonín Novotný, Czechoslovak president
 Antonín Novotný (chess composer) (1827–1871), Czech chess composer
 Boris Novotný (born 1976), Slovak judoka
 David Novotný (born 1969), Czech actor
 David Jan Novotný (born 1947), Czech writer
 Eduard Novotný (born 1921), Czech bobsledder
 Fritz Novotny, Austrian art historian
 Franz Novotny (born 1949), Austrian film producer, director, screenwriter
 Franz Nikolaus Novotny (1743–1773), organist and composer at the Esterházy court
 Geeta Novotny, American mezzo-soprano and writer
 Jan Novotný, Czech artist
 Jan Novotný (footballer) (born 1982)
 Jana Novotná (1968–2017), Czech tennis player
 Jarmila Novotná, Czech actress
 Jeanne Novotny, US professor of nursing
 Jiří Novotný (footballer)
 Jiří Novotný (ice hockey)
 Josef Novotný, Czech volleyball player
 Manfred Novotný, Czech luger
 Michael Novotny, fictional character in the TV series Queer as Folk
 Michal Novotný, Czech snowboarder
 Milos Novotny, chemist
 Monica Novotny, American journalist
 Nancy Novotny, American voice actress
 Ondřej Novotný, Czech footballer
 Pavel Novotný (footballer) (born 1973)
 Radek Novotný, Czech orienteering competitor
 Ray Novotny (1907–1995), US football player
 Reid Novotny, American politician
 René Novotný, Czech figure skater
 Roman Novotný (born 1986), Czech long jumper
 Růžena Novotná, Czech canoer
 Štěpán Novotný, Czech ice hockey player
 Tuva Novotny, Swedish actress/singer

See also
 
 
 Nowotny as a surname

Czech-language surnames
Slovak-language surnames